The Red Forest is a forest destroyed by nuclear fallout from the Chernobyl disaster in the exclusion zone.

Red Forest may also refer to:

 The Red Forest, a sculpture in Denver, Colorado, U.S.
 Red Forest (album), a 2012 album by If These Trees Could Talk
 "Red Forest", a 2012 song off the eponymous album
 Red Forest (novel), a 1999 novel by Mo Yan

See also

 Reducing emissions from deforestation and forest degradation (REDD)
 United Nations REDD Programme

 
 Forest (disambiguation)
 Red (disambiguation)